Coniophanes fissidens, the yellowbelly snake, is a species of snake in the family Colubridae. The species is native to Mexico, Guatemala, Honduras, Belize, Nicaragua, El Salvador, Costa Rica, Panama, Ecuador, Peru, and Colombia.

References

Coniophanes
Snakes of North America
Snakes of South America
Reptiles described in 1858
Reptiles of Mexico
Taxa named by Albert Günther